Acacia truculenta is a shrub of the genus Acacia and the subgenus Phyllodineae. It is native to a small area in the  Goldfields-Esperance region of Western Australia.

It blooms from August to September and produces yellow flowers.

See also
List of Acacia species

References

truculenta
Acacias of Western Australia
Taxa named by Bruce Maslin